Viseu Airport , also known as Gonçalves Lobato Airport is an airport in Viseu, Portugal.

Airlines and destinations
The following airlines operate regular scheduled and charter flights at Viseu Airport:

See also
Transport in Portugal
List of airports in Portugal

References

Airports in Portugal
Buildings and structures in Viseu District